Calgary-North West is a provincial electoral district in Calgary, Alberta, Canada. The district was created in 1979 and is mandated to return a single member to the Legislative Assembly of Alberta.

History
The electoral district was created in the 1979 boundary redistribution from the electoral district of Calgary-Foothills and a portion of old electoral district of Banff that had been annexed by new city of Calgary boundaries.

The riding was split in half in the 2010 boundary redistribution as land on the east side became part of Calgary-Hawkwood. The south boundary also picked up some land from Calgary-Bow and the riding was extended west into land that belonged to Foothills-Rocky View where the city of Calgary had annexed land.

Boundary history

Representation history

The electoral district was created in the 1979 boundary redistribution out of the Calgary-Foothills riding. Prior to the creation of the district the area returned Progressive Conservative MLAs in Foothills since 1971.

The election held that year returned Progressive Conservative candidate Sheila Embury with a very large majority. She was re-elected in 1982 election almost doubling her popular vote. Embury retired from the legislature at dissolution in 1986.

The electors of Calgary-North West chose the second representative of the riding in the 1986 election. Progressive Conservative candidate Stan Cassin held the district for his party with a reduced majority, but still won a landslide.

The district would see its first hotly contested race in the 1989 election as Liberal candidate Frank Bruseker surged in popularity gaining over 6,000 votes under the Liberal banner compared to 1986 Liberal candidate Dean Biollo. Cassin would go down to defeat after only one term in office.

Bruseker would run for a second term in 1993. His plurality would be reduced as he hang on to win over Harley Torgerson. The 1997 election would be Bruseker's last. Despite gaining in popular vote he was defeated by Progressive Conservative candidate Greg Melchin.

Melchin would run for a second term in the 2001 general election. He would win a massive majority taking over 15,000 votes and running ahead of the second place candidate by over 11,000 votes. After the election he was appointed to his first cabinet portfolio as Minister of Revenue by Premier Ralph Klein. In 2004 he ran for his third term in office. He lost over half his popular vote from 2001 and was shuffled to be the Minister of Energy.

The 2008 election would see the riding pick its fifth representative. Melchin retired at dissolution in 2008 leaving the riding open. The electors returned Lindsay Blackett who held the district for the Progressive Conservative Party. He was appointed by Premier Ed Stelmach as Minister of Culture and Community Spirit after the election in 2008.

Legislature results

1979 general election

1982 general election

1986 general election

1989 general election

1993 general election

1997 general election

2001 general election

2004 general election

2008 general election

2012 general election

2015 general election

2019 general election

Senate nominee results

2004 Senate nominee election district results

Voters had the option of selecting 4 Candidates on the Ballot

2012 Senate nominee election district results

Student Vote results

2004 election

On November 19, 2004, a Student Vote was conducted at participating Alberta schools to parallel the 2004 Alberta general election results. The vote was designed to educate students and simulate the electoral process for persons who have not yet reached the legal majority. The vote was conducted in 80 of the 83 provincial electoral districts with students voting for actual election candidates. Schools with a large student body that reside in another electoral district had the option to vote for candidates outside of the electoral district then where they were physically located.

2012 election

References

External links 
the Legislative Assembly of Alberta

Alberta provincial electoral districts
Politics of Calgary